Miodrag Jovanović (born 24 March 1977) is a Serbian former footballer who played the biggest part of his career for Russian club FC Khimki. He holds the club record for most appearances for the club in all competitions (238).

References

External links
 Profile at Khimki

1977 births
Sportspeople from Niš
Living people
Serbian footballers
Association football defenders
FK Radnički Niš players
FC Khimki players
FC Chernomorets Novorossiysk players
Russian Premier League players
Serbian expatriate footballers
Expatriate footballers in Russia
Serbian expatriate sportspeople in Russia